Ernst Witkamp (1854–1897), was a Dutch painter.

He was born in Amsterdam and was a pupil of August Allebé, Barend Wijnveld, Louis Koopman and Jacob Olie at the Rijksakademie van Beeldende Kunsten there. He was a member of Arti et Amicitiae and won the Willink van Collen prize. He was curator of the Museum Fodor during the years 1894–1897.
He died in Amsterdam.

References

Ernst Witkamp on Artnet

1854 births
1897 deaths
Dutch male painters
Painters from Amsterdam
19th-century Dutch painters
19th-century Dutch male artists